Ski Mount Abram is a small family ski area in Greenwood, Maine, located a few miles outside of nearby Bethel, Maine.

Lifts and trails

Mt. Abram can be broken up into two parts, the main mountain and Westside. Westside is the beginner area which has one Double Chairlift and a Ski tow, most lessons are taught in this area. The main part of the mountain, serviced primarily by The Way Back Machine, another double chair, consisting of many Black Diamonds and Blue Square trails. The trails at Mt. Abram are all named after Rocky & Bullwinkle; names include Dudley Do Right, Boris Badenov, and Natasha's Niche.

References

External links
Ski Maine
Mount Abram

Ski areas and resorts in Maine
Buildings and structures in Oxford County, Maine
Tourist attractions in Oxford County, Maine